

Love Child is the second studio release by Ann Arbor, Michigan-based band Ella Riot, formerly My Dear Disco. Being a studio recording and final release, Love Child is the band's second definitive work. It was engineered and recorded at Mission Sound studio. The band released a music video of the album's fourth track "It Could Be". The song's theme is "liberation" and according to band founder Tyler Duncan the video's concept is: "an unlikely person having the ideal response to our music." An album review by Mark Deming of AllMusic characterized the music as pop, influenced by funk, techno and house, and called the band's approach original. The last track "Clubbin" has bagpipes as the lead instrument, with Deming calling the fusion of bagpipes and guitars "a welcome bit of inspired lunacy".

Track listing

Personnel 
Credits adapted from Bandcamp music store.

 Ella Riot – writing, production 
 Michelle Chamuel – lead vocals
 Tyler Duncan – synthesizer, uilleann pipes, vocals, mixing
 Robert Lester – guitar
 Mike Shea – drums
 Joe Dart – bass 
 Oliver Strauss (Mission Sound) – recording, assistant production
 Devin Kerr (Good Hertz) – final mixing, assistant production
 Joe LaPorta (The Lodge) – mastering
 Jon Morgan – photography
 Andrew Le – design

References

External links

2011 EPs
Ella Riot EPs